Elizabeth Schrader Polczer, better known as Elizabeth Schrader,  is an American biblical scholar who concentrates on textual studies concerning Mary Magdalene, the Gospel of John, and the Nag Hammadi corpus. Before transitioning to her academic focus,  she was a singer/songwriter professionally known as Libbie Schrader.  

Schrader grew up in Portland, Oregon and moved to California to attend Pomona College, from which she graduated in 2001. She moved to New York in 2008.

Schrader's involvement with religious scholarship began after a long and successful career as a singer-songwriter. In 2010 she launched a fan-funded campaign to record her album Magdalene. The album's title track led to Schrader doing research into Mary Magdalene in the Gospel of John, to two master's degrees in theology from General Theological Seminary, and to her current doctoral studies in Early Christianity and New Testament at Duke University. She currently resides in Durham, North Carolina.

Scholarship 
Schrader is a textual critic who studies discrepancies between the earliest manuscripts of the gospels. She is particularly concerned with the many textual variants around the name Maria in manuscripts of John’s Gospel, and argues that such textual instabilities might be connected to controversies around Mary Magdalene in early Christianity. In her peer-reviewed articles Was Martha of Bethany Added to the Fourth Gospel in the Second Century?  and ’Rabbouni,’ which means Lord: Narrative Variants in John 20:16, she suggests that the earliest extant manuscripts of John’s Gospel may contain evidence of editorial attempts to minimize Mary Magdalene’s role in that gospel. In her peer-reviewed article The Meaning of ‘Magdalene’: A Review of Literary Evidence (co-written with Joan Taylor), Schrader and Taylor argue that the word “Magdalene” could be an honorific title, not necessarily referencing Mary’s hometown (which, Schrader argues, could be Bethany).

In 2022, Schrader presented the Carpenter Program Women’s History Month Lecture at Vanderbilt University, and she has made academic presentations at the Duke Divinity School and other universities.

Music 

Schrader was the first winner of the Pantene Pro-Voice competition in 2001, after a performance opening for Jewel at SummerStage in New York's Central Park. That same year, Schrader's group, The Wash, won the inaugural Pantene Pro-Voice Competition. In 2002, Schrader's group, known then as Think of England was chosen to be a part of Jewel's Soul City Café program, and opened three shows on her This Way tour. She also opened for other artists as diverse as India.Arie, Michelle Branch, Ray LeMontagne, and Rusted Root.

After Schrader went solo, she was a featured artist on MySpace in early 2006 and appeared in the Gilmore Girls episode Partings later that year.

A 2017 article in The Oregonian noted that despite her recent involvement biblical scholarship, Schrader's songs still "...focus on secular themes of love and loss, desire and real-life events, both serious and light-hearted."

Albums 
 Letters to Boys (2004, self-released)
 Taking the Fall (2005, self-released)
 Libbie Schrader (2007, self-released)
 Magdalene (2011, self-released)
 Red Thread (2017, self-released)

References

External links 
Official website
Elizabeth Schrader CV

Libbie Schrader's performance at the Pantene Pro-Voice Competition
Libbie Schrader singing "Magdalene" 
Libbie Schrader albums on Apple Music

Living people
Polczer, Elizabeth Schrader
Polczer, Elizabeth Schrader
Polczer, Elizabeth Schrader
21st-century American women singers
21st-century American singers
21st-century American pianists
American women pop singers
American women singer-songwriters
American pop pianists
American women pianists
Singers from Los Angeles
Singers from New York City
Singer-songwriters from Oregon
Polczer, Elizabeth Schrader
Polczer, Elizabeth Schrader
1979 births
Singer-songwriters from California
Singer-songwriters from New York (state)